Punaradhivasam is a 2000 Indian Malayalam-language drama film directed by V. K. Prakash and written by P. Balachandran, starring Nandita Das and Manoj K. Jayan. This film won the National Film Award for Best Feature Film in Malayalam, Kerala State Film Award for Best Debut Director and Kerala State Film Award for Best Story.

Plot 

It tells the tale of a few people whose minds need to be rehabilitated — a father and son who are not able to understand and love each other, and a lady who fails to love and get love from her husband. Another core character in the story is the daughter-in-law, who comes from a household where love and understanding are in abundance.

Cast 
 Nandita Das
 Manoj K. Jayan
 Lalu Alex
 Sai Kumar
 Praveena
 Bindu Ramakrishnan

Awards 
 2000 National Film Award for Best Feature Film in Malayalam
 2000 Kerala State Film Award for Best Debut Director
 2000 Kerala State Film Award for Best Story

References

External links 
 Punaradhivasam at Oneindia.in
 http://www.raaga.com/channels/malayalam/movie/M0000582.html

2000 films
2000s Malayalam-language films
Best Malayalam Feature Film National Film Award winners
Films directed by V. K. Prakash